Colfax–Mingo Community School District is a rural public school district headquartered in Colfax, Iowa.

Located in Jasper County, it serves Colfax, Mingo, Ira, Valeria, and the portion of Mitchellville in Jasper County.

The Colfax and Mingo school districts consolidated on July 1, 1985.

History
The Poweshiek township school district (including Mingo) was organized by 1849. The independent district of Colfax was formed in April, 1876.  Later that year, a bond was passed for $3,500 for the erection of a suitable school building in Colfax.

In 1910, the Colfax school had 15 teachers and an enrollment of 706, and the Poweshiek township schools had an enrollment of 244.

Schools
The district operates two schools, both located in Colfax.
Colfax–Mingo Elementary School
Colfax–Mingo High School

Colfax–Mingo High School

Athletics 
The Tigerhawks compete in the South Iowa Cedar League Conference in the following sports:

Cross Country (boys and girls)
 Girls' State Champions - 1992, 1993
Volleyball (girls)
Football 
Basketball (boys and girls)
Wrestling
Track and Field (boys and girls)
Golf (boys and girls)
 1997 Class 2A State Champions
Baseball
Softball
 2001 Class 1A State Champions

See also
List of school districts in Iowa
List of high schools in Iowa

References

External links
 Colfax–Mingo Community School District
 

Education in Jasper County, Iowa
School districts in Iowa
1985 establishments in Iowa
School districts established in 1985